A cellarium (from the Latin cella, "pantry"), also known as an undercroft, was a storehouse or storeroom, usually in a medieval monastery or castle. In English monasteries, it was usually located in or under the buildings on the west range of the cloister.

The monastery's supplies of food, ale and wines were stored there, under the supervision of the cellarer, one of the monastery's obedientiaries. He was often assisted by a sub-cellarer.

References

Christian monastic architecture